Gaocun (Mandarin: 高村乡) is a township in Pingwu County, Mianyang, Sichuan, China. In 2010, Gaocun Township had a total population of 5,334: 2,815 males and 2,519 females: 763 aged under 14, 4,006 aged between 15 and 65 and 565 aged over 65.

References 

Township-level divisions of Sichuan
Pingwu County